Ghana (Katakana:) is a brand of chocolate manufactured by the Korean company Lotte Confectionery since 1964 and South Korea since 1975. Its name is a homage to the country Ghana, one of the world's largest exporters of cocoa beans from which chocolate is made. The confectionery has a creamy texture, and is a popular brand in both South Korea and Japan. 

Japan's Ghana chocolate is made by Lotte in Japan and unlike Korea's Ghana chocolate, it uses cocoa butter by using the microglind method. Like Korea, the Japanese Ghana chocolate is written as 'Ghana' in English. Ghana has four kinds of chocolate wrapped in red, black, white and beige.

Selected varieties 

 Ghana cacao milk chocolate
 Ghana black excellent
 Ghana excellent bite size
 Ghana black
 Ghana toppo
 Ghana mild cacao mild chocolate
 Ghana Air (Air light)

Notable endorsers 

Lee Mi-yeon (Korea, 1980s)
Masami Nagasawa
Emi Takei
Mao Asada, Yuzuru Hanyu, Tao Tsuchiya, Airi Matsui (Japan, 2014)
Miwa Yoshida
Kyōko Koizumi
Ei Morisako
Kyoko Fukada
Aya Ueto
Jo Bo-ah (Korea, 2012)
Lee Hye-ri (Korea, 2016)
Park Bo-gum (Korea, 2017), the brand's first Korean male endorser
 Jun Ji-hyun (Korea, 2021)

Wanna One
IU
Amerado

See also 
List of chocolate bar brands
Chocolate bars
Chocolates
Amerado - Ghana Chocolate

References

External links 
Golden Tree Chocolate, Ghana - Official Page

Chocolate bars